"O Love Is Teasin'" is an EP released by former Belle & Sebastian member Isobel Campbell. The album was released in May 2006. It brings traditional songs from United Kingdom and songs written by Campbell.

Track listing
"O Love Is Teasin'"
"Yearning"
"Nottamun Town"
"Lady Of Snakes"
"Barbara Ellen"
"Black Is The Colour"
"Dabbling In The Dew"

External links
 Official website Info on the album

2006 EPs